The 1992–93 Coppin State Eagles men's basketball team represented Coppin State University during the 1992–93 NCAA Division I men's basketball season. The Eagles, led by 7th year head coach Fang Mitchell, played their home games at the Coppin Center and were members of the Mid-Eastern Athletic Conference. They finished the season 22–8, 16–0 in MEAC play to win the conference regular season title. The Eagles then went on to win the MEAC tournament title to receive an automatic bid to the NCAA tournament as No. 15 seed in the East region. Coppin State lost in the first round to No. 2 seed Cincinnati, 93–66.

Roster

Schedule

|-
!colspan=9 style=| Regular season

|-
!colspan=9 style=| MEAC tournament

|-
!colspan=9 style=| NCAA tournament

References

1989-90
1992–93 Mid-Eastern Athletic Conference men's basketball season
1993 NCAA Division I men's basketball tournament participants
1992 in sports in Maryland
1993 in sports in Maryland